Beurk is an interjection similar to yuck.